The following list of Consul Generals of Israel to the United States of America is arranged by the Israeli Consulate's location in the United States. At each location the Israeli diplomats are listed in reverse chronological order.

Consulate (Atlanta)
Anat Sultan-Dadon assumed her role as the Consul General of Israel to the Southeastern United States in July 2019.
Consul General Judith Varnai-Shorer 2015 - 2019 
Consul General Opher Aviran 2010 - 2015
Consul General Reda Mansour 2006 - 2010 
Consul General Shmuel Ben-Shmuel 2002 - 2006
Consul General Jacob Rosen 2000 - 2002
Consul General Arye Mekel 1993 - 2000
Consul General Yoel Arnon 1977 - 1982
Consul General Nahum Astar 1975 - 1977 
Consul General Shlomo Levy 1973 - 1975
Consul General Benjamin Bonney 1972 - 1973
Consul General Moshe Gilboa 1969 - 1972
Consul General Zeev Bone 1966 - 1969
Consul General Nahum Astar 1956 - 1959

Consulate (Boston)
Consul General Meron Reuben 2020-
Consul General Zeev Boker 2018 - 2020
Consul General Yehuda Yaakov 2014 - 2018
Consul General Shai Bazak 2010 - 2013
Consul General Nadav Tamir 2006 - 2010 
Consul General Meir Shlomo 2002 - 2006
Consul General Itzhak Levanon 1997 - 2002
Consul General Dan Kyram 1993 - 1997
Consul General Yaakov Levy1989 - 1993
Consul General Arthur Avnon 1986 - 1989
Consul General Michael Shiloh 1983 - 1986
Consul General Michael Bavly 1978 - 1981
Consul General Shimshon Inbal 1972-1976
Consul General Raanan Sivan 1976
Consul General Yohanan Cohen 1965 - 1968

Consulate (Chicago)
Yinam Cohen 2021-
Consul General Aviv Ezra 2016 - 
Consul General Roey Gilad 2012 - 2016
Consul General Orli Gil 2008 - 2012
Consul General Barukh Binah 2005 - 2008
Consul General Moshe Ram 2001 - 2005
Consul General Tzipora Rimon 1997 - 2001
Consul General Arthur Avnon 1992 - 1997
Consul General Ori Brener 1988 - 1991 
Consul General Zvi Brosh 1985 - 1988
Consul General Moshe Gilboa 1979 - 1981
Consul General Ehud Avriel 1974 - 1977
Consul General Shaul Ramati 1969 - 1974
Consul General David Tesher 1957 - 1963
Consul General Simcha Pratt 1956 - 1957
Consul General Nahum Astar 1953
Consul General Yerachmiel Ram Yaron 1952 - 1953

Consulate (Houston)
Consul General Gilad Katz 2017 - 
Consul General Eitan Levon 2015 - 2017
Consul General Meir Shlomo 2010 - 2015
Consul General Asher Yarden 2006 - 2010
Consul General Yael Ravia-Zadok 2002 - 2005
Consul General Zion Evrony 1995 - 2002
Consul General Meir Romem 1992 - 1995
Consul General Mordecai Artzieli 1988 - 1992
Consul General Yoram Ettinger 1985 - 1988
Consul General Zeev Dover 1983 - 1985
Consul General Moshe Gidron 1979 - 1983
Consul General Yitzhak Leor 1976 - 1979
Consul General Benjamin Bonney1969 - 1972
Consul General Yaacov Hess 1966 - 1969

Consulate (Los Angeles)
Consul General Hillel Newman 2019 - 
Consul General Samuel Grundwerg 2016 - 2019
Consul General David Siegel 2011 - 2016
Consul General Jacob-Shaul Dayan 2007 - 2011
Consul General Ehud Danoch 2004 - 2007
Consul General Yuval Rotem 1999 - 2004
Consul General Yoram Ben-Zeev 1995 - 1999 
Consul General Eytan Bentsur 1986 - 1988
Consul General Binyamin Navon 1978 - 1986
Consul General Zvi Brosh 1976 - 1978
Consul General Hanoch Givton 1975 - 1976
Consul General Yakov Aviad 1972 - 1975
Consul General Yehezkel Carmel 1970 - 1972
Consul General Mordechai Shalev 1961 - 1965
Consul General Yaacov Avnon 1958 - 1961
Consul General Avraham Biran 1955 - 1958
Consul General Harry Beilin 1951 - 1954
Consul General Reuven Dafni 1948 - 1951

Consulate (Miami)
Consul General Maor Elbaz-Starinsky 2021 -
Consul General Lior Haiat 2016 - 2021
Consul General Chaim Shacham 2011 - 2016
Consul General Ofer Bavly 2007 - 2011 
Consul General Yitzhak Ben Gad 2005 - 2007
Consul General Michael Arbel 2000 - 2004
Consul General Shai Bazak 1998 - 2000
Consul General Yoel Arnon 1982 - 1983

Consulate (New York)

Consul General Asaf Zamir 2021 -
Consul General Daniel Dayan 2016 - 2020
Consul General Ido Aharoni 2011 - 2016
Consul General Asaf Shariv 2007 - 2010
Consul General Arye Mekel 2004 - 2007
Consul General Alon Pinkas 2000 - 2004
Consul General Shmuel Siso 1997 - 2001
Colette Avital 1992-1996
Consul General Yoseph Kedar 1978
Consul General Uri Ben-Ari 1975 - 1978
Consul General David Rivlin 1971 - 1975
Consul General Rehavam Amir 1968 - 1971
Consul General Micahel Arnon 1965 - 1968
Consul General Katriel Katz 1962 - 1965
Consul General Arie Eshel 1962
Consul General Binyamin Eliav 1960 - 1961
Consul General Simcha Pratt 1957 - 1960
Consul General Semah Cecil Hyman 1955 - 1957
Consul General Avraham Harman 1953 - 1955
Consul General Arthur Lourie (diplomat) 1948 - 1953

Consulate (Philadelphia)
Consul General Yaron Sideman 2012 - 2016
Consul General Daniel Kutner 2008 - 2012 
Consul General Uriel Palti 2004 - 2008
Consul General Giora Becher 2000 - 2004
Consul General Dan Ashbel 1997 - 2000
Consul General Eviatar Manor 1993 - 1996
Consul General Pinchas Gonen 1981 - 1985
Consul General Asher Naim 1976 - 1981
Consul General Yissakhar Ben-Yaakov 1966 - 1969

Consulate (San Francisco)
Consul General Shlomi Kofman 2017 - 
Consul General Andy David 2012 - 2017
Consul General Akiva Tor 2008 - 2012
Consul General David Akov 2004 - 2008
Consul General Yosef Amrani 2000 - 2004
Consul General Daniel Shek 1999 - 2000
Consul General Nimrod Barkan 1995 - 1997
Consul General Jehudi Kinar 1993 - 1995
Consul General Harry Kney-Tal 1988 - 1993
Consul General Mordecai Artzieli 1977 - 1982
Consul General Shlomo Tadmor 1976 - 1977
Consul General Gideon Saguy 1963 - 1968

See also
Israel–United States relations
List of ambassadors of Israel to the United States

References

Israeli consuls
Consuls